ADECO or Adeco may refer to: 

Sports
 Associação Desportiva Centro Olímpico, a Brazilian women's soccer team

Politics
 Costeño Democratic Alliance, a Nicaraguan regional political party